Carl Hinrichs (September 18, 1907 – December 7, 1967) was a German stage and film actor.

Selected filmography
 On the Reeperbahn at Half Past Midnight (1954)
 The Happy Village (1955)
 The Three from the Filling Station (1955)
  (1958)

Bibliography
 Körner, Torsten. Der kleine Mann als Star: Heinz Rühmann und seine Filme der 50er Jahre. Campus Verlag, 2001.

External links

1907 births
1967 deaths
German male film actors
German male stage actors
People from Oldenburg (city)
20th-century German male actors